Harold George Mitford Barton (10 November 1882 – 3 July 1970) was an English cricketer. Barton was a right-handed batsman.

Barton made his debut in county cricket for Buckinghamshire in the 1907 Minor Counties Championship against Wiltshire. Barton played two further matches for Buckinghamshire in 1907 against Berkshire and the Surrey Second XI.

Barton made his first-class debut for Hampshire in the 1910 County Championship against Northamptonshire. Jones played five first-class matches for Hampshire from 1910 to 1912, with his final first-class appearance coming against Gloucestershire.

Barton died at Southampton, Hampshire on 3 July 1970.

External links
Harold Barton at Cricinfo
Harold Barton at CricketArchive

1882 births
1970 deaths
People from Christchurch, Dorset
Cricketers from Dorset
English cricketers
Buckinghamshire cricketers
Hampshire cricketers